Primrose Cottage was the first permanent private home in Roswell, Georgia, United States. The house built and completed in 1839 for Roswell King's recently widowed daughter, Eliza King Hand, and her children. Roswell King also moved into the house with his daughter's family.

As of 2021, the house functions as an events' facility.

It is listed on the National Register of Historic Places as a contributing building in the Roswell Historic District.

Willis Ball designed and/or built it. He also designed or built at least three other properties in Roswell Historic District, including the Roswell Presbyterian Church. 

The home was purchased in 1853 by George H. Camp, Roswell’s first postmaster and successor to Barrington King as the president of the Roswell Manufacturing Company. Nap Rucker, a former major league pitcher with the Brooklyn Dodgers and the Mayor of Roswell in the 1930s, was also a resident.

References

Cited sources 
 Joe McTyre and Rebecca Hash Paden, Historic Roswell Georgia (Images of America), Arcadia Publishing, 2001, .

External links

 Primose Cottage official website
 Roswell Convention and Visitors Bureau

Houses completed in 1839
Houses in Fulton County, Georgia
Tourist attractions in Roswell, Georgia
Roswell Historic District (Roswell, Georgia)
National Register of Historic Places in Roswell, Georgia